The 2017–18 Louisville Cardinals women's basketball team represented the University of Louisville during the 2017–18 NCAA Division I women's basketball season. The Cardinals, led by 11th-year head coach Jeff Walz, played their home games at the KFC Yum! Center in their fourth year in the Atlantic Coast Conference. They finished the season 36–3, 15–1 in ACC play to win a share of the regular season title. They defeated Virginia Tech, NC State, and Notre Dame to win the ACC women's tournament. As a result, they received the conference's automatic bid to the NCAA women's tournament. As the No. 1 seed in the Lexington region, they defeated Boise State and Marquette to advance to the Sweet Sixteen. There they defeated Stanford and Oregon State in the Elite Eight to advance to the school's third Final Four. In the Final Four, they lost to Mississippi State in overtime.

Previous season
The Cardinals finished the 2016–17 season at 29–8, 12–4 in ACC play to finish in a tie for fourth place. They advanced to the semifinals of the ACC women's tournament where they lost to Notre Dame. They received an at-large bid for the NCAA women's tournament and advanced to the Sweet Sixteen where they lost to Baylor.

Roster

Rankings

Schedule and results

|-
!colspan=9 style=| Regular season

|-
!colspan=9 style=| ACC Women's Tournament

|-
!colspan=9 style=| NCAA Women's Tournament

Source

References

Louisville Cardinals women's basketball seasons
Louisville
Louisville Cardinals women's basketball, 2017-18
Louisville Cardinals women's basketball, 2017-18
Louisville
NCAA Division I women's basketball tournament Final Four seasons